Carlos Alberto Campos Ávila (born 13 April 1992) in Mexico D.F. is a Mexican footballer who plays as a midfielder for Reboceros de La Piedad of the Liga Premier de México.

International career
He was part of the 2009 FIFA U-17 World Cup Mexico squad.

Pumas Fuerzas Básicas

(correct as of 4 January 2011)

References

External links
 Profile

1992 births
Living people
Footballers from Mexico City
Association football midfielders
Mexico youth international footballers
Club Universidad Nacional footballers
Inter Playa del Carmen players
Atlético Reynosa footballers
La Piedad footballers
Liga MX players
Mexican footballers